Hayden Mountain Summit (el. 4705 ft.) is a mountain pass in the U.S. state of Oregon traversed by Oregon Route 66.

See also 
 Applegate Trail
 Hayden Mountain (Oregon)

References 
 USGS Geographic Names Information System listing

Mountain passes of Oregon
Landforms of Klamath County, Oregon